James Alanai Olakunle (born 14 June 1947) is a Nigerian sprinter. He competed in the men's 4 × 100 metres relay at the 1972 Summer Olympics. Olakunle won a bronze medal in the 4 x 100 metres relay at the 1974 British Commonwealth Games.

References

1947 births
Living people
Athletes (track and field) at the 1972 Summer Olympics
Nigerian male sprinters
Olympic athletes of Nigeria
Commonwealth Games bronze medallists for Nigeria
Commonwealth Games medallists in athletics
Athletes (track and field) at the 1974 British Commonwealth Games
Place of birth missing (living people)
Medallists at the 1974 British Commonwealth Games